Altar Wedge Tomb is a wedge-shaped gallery grave and National Monument located outside the village of Schull, in County Cork, Ireland.

Location
Altar Wedge Tomb is located 6.7 km (4.2 mi) WSW of Schull, on a cliffedge near Toormore Bay.

History
Wedge tombs of this kind were built in Ireland in the late Neolithic and early Bronze Age, c. 2500–2000 BC.

Cremated burials took place in 2000 BC and pit burials c. 1200 BC. Around AD 200 a pit was dug and filled in with fish, shellfish and cetacean bones, presumably as a ritual practice.

Despite the name, there is no evidence that the "altar" was ever used for sacrifice. It was used as a Mass rock in the 18th century AD. A holy well stood across the road.

It was excavated in summer 1989 by Dr. William O'Brien and Madeline Duggan. Material found included cremated human adult bones, a tooth, worked flint, charcoal, periwinkles, fish bones and limpets.

Description

The entrance was aligned ENE–WSW, possibly with Mizen Peak (Carn Uí Néit) and maybe to catch the setting sun at Samhain (1 November).

There is no cairn material or evidence of kerbstones; they may have been removed for road construction in the 19th century AD.

References

National Monuments in County Cork
Archaeological sites in County Cork
Tombs in the Republic of Ireland